Wildfire suppression is a range of firefighting tactics used to suppress wildfires. Firefighting efforts in wild land areas require different techniques, equipment, and training from the more familiar structure fire fighting found in populated areas. Working in conjunction with specially designed aerial firefighting aircraft, these wildfire-trained crews suppress flames, construct fire lines, and extinguish flames and areas of heat to protect resources and natural wilderness. Wildfire suppression also addresses the issues of the wildland–urban interface, where populated areas border with wild land areas.

In the United States and other countries, aggressive wildfire suppression aimed at minimizing fire has contributed to accumulation of fuel loads, increasing the risk of large, catastrophic fires.

History

Australia
Wildland fire, known in Australia as bush fire, has played a major role in Australia due to arid conditions. Notable fire services tasked with wildfire suppression include NPWS (National Parks and Wildlife Service, NSW), the New South Wales Rural Fire Service, the South Australian Country Fire Service, the Western Australian Parks and Wildlife Service, the Victorian Department of Environment Land Water and Planning (DELWP), and the Country Fire Authority.

Canada
Canada contains approximately 3,964,000 km2 of forest land.  Seventy-five percent of this is boreal forest, made up primarily of coniferous trees. More than 90 percent of Canadian forest land is publicly owned, and the provincial and territorial governments are responsible for fire-suppression activities.  The Federal Canadian Interagency Forest Fire Centre (CIFFC) provides operational fire-control services and links to all provincial and territorial fire agencies.

The number of fires and area burned can vary dramatically from year to year. Average suppression costs are $500 million to $1 billion annually.

In Canada, two-thirds of all forest fires are caused by people, while lightning causes the remaining third. Despite this, lightning fires account for over 85 percent of the area burned in Canada, largely because many of the lightning-caused fires occur in remote, inaccessible areas. Currently about ninety percent of forest fires are fought. Generally fires near communities, industrial infrastructure, and forests with high commercial and recreation value are given high priority for suppression efforts.  In remote areas and wilderness parks, fires may be left to burn as part of the natural ecological cycle.

United States
Indigenous communities embraced fire as an ally in preserving nature, but once populations began to grow across the U.S., wildfires started to trigger unprecedented destruction of property and sometimes resulted in massive death tolls. Greater impact on people's lives led to government intervention and changes to how wildfires were addressed.

One of the first turning points for firefighting philosophies in the U.S. happened in October 1871, the year of the Great Chicago Fire. Six years removed from the Civil War, the Fire destroyed more than 17,000 buildings across the Windy City, upended thousands of lives and devastated their thriving business community, which did not fully recover until the World's Fair came to Chicago in 1893.

The Great Chicago Fire left an indelible mark on the city, and much of its lasting impact came from the introduction of more sensible building codes. However, another fire broke out the same day as the Chicago Fire that few people ever discuss. It was much larger than the Chicago Fire, was more deadly and had a more significant influence on the federal government and its role in fire management.

The Peshtigo Fire broke out on the morning of October 8, 1871. It burned for three days, and while estimates vary, the consensus is that it killed more than 1,200 people – and is still the deadliest wildfire in American history.

In addition to the number of people killed, the fire burned more than 1.2 million acres of land and spread to nearby towns, where it caused even more damage. The entire town of Peshtigo was destroyed within an hour of the start of the fire.

News of the historical destruction spread slowly. People soon realized that in addition to the Great Chicago Fire and the Peshtigo Fire, another fire in Michigan that occurred at the same time burned more than two million acres.

As a result of the 1871 fire breakouts, the federal government saw that it needed to act. This led in 1876 to the creation of the Office of Special Agent in the U.S. Department of Agriculture to assess the quality and conditions of forests in the United States. As the forerunner of the U.S. Forest Service, this was the first time that wildfire management was placed under government purview.

Objectives and risks

Safety

Protection of human life is first priority for firefighters. Since 1995, when arriving on a scene, a fire crew will establish safety zones and escape routes, verify communication is in place, and designate lookouts (known in the U.S. by the acronym LCES, for lookouts, communications, escape routes, safety zones). This allows the firefighters to engage a fire with options for a retreat should their current situation become unsafe. Although other safety zones should be designated, areas already burned generally provide a safe refuge from fire provided they have cooled sufficiently, are accessible, and have burned enough fuels so as to not reignite. Briefings may be done to inform new fire resources of hazards and other pertinent information.

A great emphasis is placed on safety and preventing entrapment, a situation where escape from the fire is impossible. Prevention of this situation is reinforced with two training protocols, Ten Standard Firefighting Orders and Eighteen Situations That Shout Watch Out, which warn firefighters of potentially dangerous situations, developed in the aftermath of the Mann Gulch fire. As a last resort, many wildland firefighters carry a fire shelter.  In this inescapable situation, the shelter will provide limited protection from radiant and convective heat, as well as superheated air. Entrapment within a fire shelter is called a burnover. In Australia, firefighters rarely carry fireshelters (commonly referred to as "Shake 'N' Bake" shelters); rather, training is given to locate natural shelters or use hand tools to create protection; or, in the instance of 'burnover' in a tanker or other fire appliance, 'fire overrun' training is used.

Hazards beyond the fire are posed as well. A very small sample of these include: unstable/hazardous trees, animals, electrical cables, unexploded ordnance, hazardous materials, rolling and falling debris, and lightning.

Personal safety is also vital to wildland firefighting.  The proper use of PPE (personal protective equipment) and firefighting equipment will help minimise accidents. At the very minimum, wildland firefighters should have proper fire-retardant clothing (such as Nomex), protective headgear, wildland firefighting-specific boots, gloves, water for hydration, fire shelters, eye protection, and some form of communication (most commonly a radio).

Resource protection
Other resources are ranked according to importance and/or value. These include but are not limited to human health and safety, construction cost, ecological impacts, social and legal consequences and the costs of protection. Defendability is also considered, as more effort will need to be expended on saving a house with a wooden-shake roof than one with a tile roof, for example.

Ecosystem changes 
While wildfire suppression serves human safety and resource protection, the lack of natural fires can be the cause of ecosystem changes, as can the size of fires when they do occur. Fire ecology is accordingly not as simple as many might assume. Notably, across the global grassland and savanna ecosystems, fire suppression is frequently found to be a driver of woody encroachment.

Organization 
Across the United States, wildfire suppression is administered by land management agencies including the U.S. Forest Service, Bureau of Land Management, U.S. Fish and Wildlife Service, National Park Service, the Bureau of Reclamation, the Army Corps of Engineers, and state departments of forestry. All of these groups contribute to the National Wildfire Coordinating Group and the National Interagency Fire Center.

The National Interagency Fire Center hosts the National Interagency Coordination Center (NICC). NICC's primary responsibility is positioning and managing national resources (i.e. Hotshot Crews, smokejumpers, air tankers, incident management teams, National Caterers, mobile shower units, and command repeaters). NICC also serves as clearing house for the dispatch ordering system.  Reporting to NICC are 10 Geographic Area Coordination Centers (Alaska, Great Basin, Northern Rockies, Rocky Mountains, Southern California, Northern California, Eastern, Southern, Southwest and Northwest).  Under each GACC are several dispatch zones.

Management
Managing any number of resources over varying-size areas in often very rugged terrain is extremely challenging. An incident commander (IC) is charged with overall command of an incident. In the U.S., the Incident Command System designates this as being the first on scene providing they have sufficient training. The size of the fire, measured in acres or chains, as well as the complexity of the incident and threats to developed areas, will later dictate the class-level of IC required. Incident management teams aid on larger fire incidents to meet more complex priorities and objectives of the incident commander. It provides support staff to handle duties such as communication, fire behavior modeling, and map- and photo-interpretation. Again in the U.S., management coordination between fires is primarily done by the National Interagency Fire Center (NIFC).

Specific agencies and different incident management teams may include a number of different individuals with various responsibilities and varying titles. A fire information officer (PIOF) generally provides fire-related information to the public, for example. Branch chiefs and division chiefs serve as management on branches and divisions, respectively, as the need for these divisions arise. Investigators may be called to ascertain the fire's cause. Prevention officers such as forest rangers may patrol their jurisdictional areas to teach fire prevention and prevent some human-caused fires from happening to begin with.

Communication
Information may be communicated on fires in many forms. Radios, vocals, visual signals such as flagging and mirrors, literature such as an IAP or incident action plan, whistles and mobile touch-screen computer terminals are some examples. The USFS Visual Signal Code system provides symbols used to communicate from ground to air, while aircraft may use wing tilting, motor gunning or circling to communicate air-to-ground.

Radio communication is very typical for communication during a wildfire. This is due to the wide coverage provided and the ability to communicate in a one-to-many format. One of the most popular radio manufacturers for this application is Relm Wireless (also known as Bendix King and BK Radio). The company is based in Florida, U.S., and holds many contracts with various government entities. The other up-and-coming company entering this niche market is Midland Radio. Its U.S. headquarters is in the midwest (Kansas City, Missouri), and it manufacturers many radio models, including mobiles and portables.

Tactics

Operating in the U.S. within the context of fire use, firefighters may only suppress fire that has become uncontrollable. Conversely, fires or portions of a fire that have previously been engaged by firefighters may be treated as fire use situation and be left to burn.

All fire suppression activities are based from an anchor point (such as lake, rock slide, road or other natural or artificial fire break). From an anchor point firefighters can work to contain a wild land fire without the fire outflanking them.

Large fires often become extended campaigns. Incident command posts (ICPs) and other temporary fire camps are constructed to provide food, showers, and rest to fire crews.

Weather conditions and fuel conditions are large factors in the decisions made on a fire. Within the U.S., the Energy Release Component (ERC) is a scale relating fuel energy potential to area. The Burning Index (BI) relates flame length to fire spread speed and temperature. The Haines Index (HI) tracks stability and humidity of air over a fire. The Keetch-Byram Drought Index relates fuels to how quickly they could ignite and to what percentage they should burn. The Lightning Activity Level (LAL) ranks lightning potential into six classes.

Fuel models are specific fuel designations determined by energy burning potential. Placed into 13 classes, they range from "short grass" (model 1) to "logging slash" (model 13). Low-numbered models burn at lower intensities than those at the higher end.

Direct attack

Direct attack is any treatment applied directly to burning fuel such as wetting, smothering, or chemically quenching the fire, or by physically separating the burning from not burned fuel. This includes the work of urban and wildland fire engines, fire personnel and aircraft applying water or fire retardant directly to the burning fuel. For most agencies, the objective is to make a fireline around all fire meant to be suppressed.

Indirect attack
Preparatory suppression tactics used a distance away from the oncoming fire are considered indirect. Firelines may be built in this manner as well. Fuel reduction, indirect firelines, contingency firelines, backburning and wetting unburnt fuels are examples. This method may allow for more effective planning. It may allow for more ideally placed firelines in lighter fuels using natural barriers to fire and for safer firefighter working conditions in less smoke filled and cooler areas. However, it may also allow for more burned acreage, larger hotter fires, and the possibility of wasted time constructing unused firelines.

Attempts to control wildfires may also include by controlling the area that it can spread to by creating control lines: boundaries that contain no combustible material. These may be constructed by physically removing combustible material with tools and equipment, or portions may be naturally occurring. Lines may also be created by backfiring: creating small, low-intensity fires using driptorches or flares. The resultant fires are extinguished by firefighters or, ideally, directed in such a way that they meet the main fire front, at which point both fires run out of flammable material and are thus extinguished. Additionally, the use of long-term fire retardants, fire-fighting foams, and superabsorbent polymer gels may be used. Such compounds reduce the flammability of materials by either blocking the fire physically or by initiating a chemical reaction that stops the fire.

However, any method can fail in the face of erratic or high-intensity winds and changing weather. Changing winds may cause fires to change direction and miss control lines. High-intensity winds may cause jumping or spotting as burning embers are carried through the air over a fireline. Burning trees may fall and burning materials may roll across the line, effectively negating the barrier.

Mop-up 
The threat of wildfires does not cease after the flames have passed, as smoldering heavy fuels may continue to burn unnoticed for days after flaming. It is during this phase that either the burn area exterior or the complete burn area of a fire is cooled so as to not reignite another fire.

Rehabilitation
Constructed firelines, breaks, safety zones and other items may damage soil systems, encouraging erosion from surface run-off and gully formation. The loss of plant life from the fire also contributes to erosion. Construction of waterbars, the addition of plants and debris to exposed soils and other measures help to reduce this.

Fires at the wildland-urban interface

Wildfires can pose risks to human settlement in three main scenarios. The first can happen at the classic wildland-urban interface, where urban or suburban development borders wild land. The second happens at the mixed wildland-urban interface, where homes or small communities are interspersed throughout a wild area, and the boundary between developed and non-developed land is undefined. The third occurs in the occluded wildland-urban interface, where pockets of wild land are enclosed within cities.

Expansive urbanization and other human activity in areas adjacent to wildlands is a primary reason for the catastrophic structural losses experienced in wildfires. Continued development of wildland-urban interface firefighting measures and the rebuilding of structures destroyed by fires has been met with criticism. Communities such as Sydney and Melbourne in Australia have been built within highly flammable forest fuels. The city of Cape Town, South Africa lies on the fringe of the Table Mountain National Park. In the western United States from the 1990s to 2007, over 8.5 million new homes were constructed on the wildland-urban interface.

Fuel buildup can result in costly, devastating fires as more new houses and ranches are built adjacent to wilderness areas. However, the population growth in these fringe areas discourages the use of current fuel management techniques. Smoke from fires is an irritant and a pollutant. Attempts to thin out the fuel load may be met with opposition due to the desirability of forested areas. Wildland goals may be further resisted because of endangered species protections and habitat preservation. The ecological benefit of fire is often overridden by the economic benefits of protecting structures and lives. Additionally, federal policies that cover wildland areas usually differ from local and state policies that govern urban lands.

In North America, the belief that fire suppression has substantially reduced the average annual area burned is widely held by resource managers, and is often thought to be self-evident. However, this belief has been the focus of vocal debate in the scientific literature.

Equipment and personnel

Wildfire suppression requires specialist personnel and equipment. Notable examples include smokejumpers (firefighters who parachute into remote areas) and helicopter support.

Efficacy

The success of wildfire suppression techniques is debated amongst the scientific community. A number of studies (produced during the 1990s) using Ontario government fire records compared either the number of fires or the average fire size between areas with and without aggressive fire suppression policies. They found that the average fire size was generally smaller in areas of aggressive policy. One report, written in 1998 by Stocks and Weber, said; "Use of fire as a management tool recognizes the natural role of fire and is applied judiciously for ecosystem maintenance and restoration in selected areas." A later 2005 study concluded that "Fire suppression is (functionally) effective insofar as it reduces area burned".

Other studies have concluded that the 20th century change in the fire cycle is a result of climate change. A 1993 study by Bergeron & Archambault said: "post-'Little Ice Age' climate change has profoundly decreased the frequency of fires in the northwestern Québec boreal forest". Critics have also pointed out that small fires are virtually unreported in areas without aggressive fire suppression policies, where detection often relies on reports from settlements or commercial aircraft, leading to incorrect average fire size data for those regions.

See also

References

Further reading
 
 
 Besenyo, Janos: Forest Fires as the New Form of Terrorism, Terrorism and Political Violence, pages 1–13, Published online: 11 Jul 2017
 Casals P, Valor T, Besalú A, Molina-Terrén D. Understory fuel load and structure eight to nine years after prescribed burning in Mediterranean pine forests. DOI: 10.1016/j.foreco.2015.11.050
 
 
  
 
 
 
 Valor T, González-Olabarria JR, Piqué M. Assessing the impact of prescribed burning on the growth of European pines. DOI: 10.1016/j.foreco.2015.02.002.

External links

 The International Association of Wildland Fire
 Canadian Wildland Fire Information System
 The Canadian Interagency Forest Fire Centre (CIFFC)
 British Columbia Ministry of Forests Protection Branch—FAQs
 United States National Interagency Fire Center
 Wildfire History and Ecology
 National Institute for Occupational Safety and Health - Fighting Wildfires
 Ballistic System for Fighting Forest Fire
 Proposed Wildfire Suppression Technology

 
Fire suppression
Forestry occupations
Occupational safety and health
Wildfire ecology
Wildfires